Epp Haabsaar (born 21 November 1953) is an Estonian judge and politician. She was a member of VII Riigikogu, representing the Estonian National Independence Party.

HHabsaar was born in Viljandi. She was a 1980 graduate of Tartu State University's Faculty of Law. Until 2012, she was a judge at Harju County Court. 

Haabsaar has compiled and illustrated a book of fairy tales. She also works as an icon painter. She has painted the icons of the iconostasis of Angerja Church of the Ascension of the Estonian Apostolic Orthodox Church in Kohila.

References

Living people
1953 births
Estonian women judges
Estonian women lawyers
Members of the Riigikogu, 1992–1995
Women members of the Riigikogu
Estonian National Independence Party politicians
Estonian women illustrators
21st-century Estonian women artists
University of Tartu alumni
People from Viljandi